Bayguskarovo (Bayğusqar) is a rural locality (a selo) in Tatyr-Uzyaksky Selsoviet, Khaybullinsky District, Bashkortostan, Russia. The population was 544 as of 2010. There are 8 streets.

Geography 
Bayguskarovo is located 27 km northwest of Akyar (the district's administrative centre) by road. Abubakirovo is the nearest rural locality.

References 

Rural localities in Khaybullinsky District